Deponija can refer to:

 Deponija, Belgrade, an urban neighborhood of Belgrade, Serbia.
 Deponija, Novi Sad, part of Novi Sad, Serbia.